The 2021 Midwestern Intercollegiate Volleyball Association Tournament is the men's volleyball tournament for the Midwestern Intercollegiate Volleyball Association held during the 2021 NCAA Division I & II men's volleyball season. It will be held April 10 through April 24, 2021 at campus sites. The winner receives the Association's automatic bid to the 2021 NCAA Volleyball Tournament.

Seeds
All eight teams are eligible for the postseason, with the highest seed hosting each round. Teams were seeded by record within the conference, with a tiebreaker system to seed teams with identical conference records.

Schedule and results

Bracket

References

Volleyball competitions in the United States
2021 Midwestern Intercollegiate Volleyball Association season